Salvatore Cazzetta is a Canadian outlaw biker and the Founder of the Rock Machine Motorcycle Club, convicted of narcotics-trafficking. He also has a long association with the Rizzuto crime family, in Quebec.

Cazzetta and Maurice "Mom" Boucher were members of a small motorcycle gang, the "SS", the club was also known as the SS Merciless Riders, which was under consideration for an invite to join the Hells Angels. The SS also had in its ranks Normand Hamill, Paul Porter, Gilles Lambert and Giovanni Cazzetta, the brother of Salvatore had joined the club in 1984.  When the Lennoxville massacre took place the two friends made different choices.

Elements of the Hells Angels' Montreal chapter had become convinced that five senior members of their club had been embezzling club profits, so they tricked them into a meeting, and killed them.  According to true crime author RJ Parker this killing triggered distrust within other elements of Canada's underworld empire.

According to Parker, the Cazzetta brothers were closely related to senior member of the Rizzuto Crime Family, and thus adopted the position that underworld members should not kill other members of their own gang.  So, where Boucher did join the Hells Angels, Cazzetta and his brother formed their own motorcycle club, Rock Machine, taking over turf formerly controlled by the weakened Montreal chapter of the Hells Angels.

According to Parker, Boucher could not strike against his former friend, out of concern the powerful Quebec Mafia would intervene.  He wrote that Boucher worked to rebuild his chapter's ties with other chapters and other underworld groups.  He wrote that Cazzetta too forged alliances, principally with the Bandidos, another powerful motorcycle club, and that he forged ties with cocaine cartels, and became one of Montreal's principal importers of cocaine.

Cazzetta's cocaine smuggling and distribution triggered extra police scrutiny. Salvatore was arrested at a pitbull farm located in Fort Erie, Ontario, in 1994 and charged with attempting to import more than eleven tons (22,000lbs) of cocaine valued at an estimated 275 million dollars US (adjusting for inflation the 2021 value is $513,238,697).

Cazzetta's detention triggered Boucher to attack the remainder of The Rock Machine. The struggle lasted eight years, and many innocent bystanders were hurt or killed. Cazzetta was in prison during the war.

By the time Cazzetta had served his sentence Boucher himself was serving a life sentence, the war was over, and The Rock Machine had been absorbed into the Bandidos.  Cazzetta chose to join the Hells Angels, in 2005.  He would rise to lead the Hells Angels in Quebec.

References

1955 births
Living people
Canadian gangsters of Italian descent
Canadian crime bosses
Canadian drug traffickers
Criminals from Montreal
Organized crime in Montreal
Hells Angels
Rock Machine Motorcycle Club